Jimmy McLuckie (2 April 1908 – 1986) was a Scottish professional footballer. During his career, he made over 100 appearances for Ipswich Town.

External links 
Jimmy McLuckie at Pride of Anglia

1908 births
1986 deaths
People from Stonehouse, South Lanarkshire
Scottish footballers
Association football wing halves
Scotland international footballers
Aston Villa F.C. players
Ipswich Town F.C. players
Manchester City F.C. players
Chelmsford City F.C. wartime guest players
English Football League players
Footballers from South Lanarkshire
Date of death missing
Place of death missing